Bežigrad Stadium, also known as Bežigrad Central Stadium, is a multi-purpose stadium in Ljubljana, Slovenia. It is the oldest stadium in Ljubljana. The stadium has been closed since 2008.

Construction of Bežigrad Stadium for the Roman Catholic youth sport association Orel began in 1925. It was designed by the architect Jože Plečnik. It takes its name from the Bežigrad district in Ljubljana, where it is located.

Bežigrad Stadium was predominantly used for football matches, and was the home of the football club NK Olimpija Ljubljana until the club's dissolution in 2005. The newly established club, NK Bežigrad, played at the stadium between 2005 and 2007.

National team matches
Between 1995 and 2004, Slovenia national football team played a total of 27 matches at the venue.

References

External links

Stadion za Bežigradom on Football Stadiums of Slovenia

Football venues in Slovenia
Football venues in Yugoslavia
Stadium
Athletics (track and field) venues in Yugoslavia
Multi-purpose stadiums in Slovenia
Sports venues in Ljubljana
Music venues in Slovenia
Jože Plečnik buildings
Sports venues completed in 1935
1935 establishments in Slovenia
7 Most Endangered Programme
20th-century architecture in Slovenia